Nyvky is a station on Kyiv Metro's Sviatoshynsko-Brovarska Line. The station was opened on 5 November 1971, and is named after Kyiv's Nyvky neighbourhood. It was designed by Boris Pryimak, I.L. Maslenkov, V.C. Bohdanovskyi, and T.A. Tselikovska.

The station is shallow underground, along with the Beresteiska and the Sviatoshyn stations, which are the first stations of the Kyiv Metro system that are not lain deep underground. The station consists of a central hall with rows of circular columns near the platforms. The columns are covered with glazed blue-coloured tiles. On the tiled walls along the tracks is a strip of plant motifs. The entrance to the station is located on the corner of the Peremohy Prospekt (Victory Avenue) and the Scherbakova Street.

External links

 Kyivsky Metropoliten — Station description and photographs 
 Metropoliten.kiev.ua — Station description and photographs 
 mirmetro.net - Photos and description 

Kyiv Metro stations
Railway stations opened in 1971
1971 establishments in Ukraine